The Festival of Moirang Shai, also known as the Seminar on Moirang Shai, is an academic and cultural annual event. The event aims to impart knowledge of the unique culture of the Meitei people at grassroots level, particularly in preserving and promoting "Moirang Shai", due to the fact that Moirang is often regarded as the origin of Meitei culture and the Khamba Thoibi Dance. It emphasizes that especially younger generation should get aware of their own culture.

During early years of the event, it had been organised as a part of the cultural policy of the Government of India according to which cultural organisations are recommended for interaction with students and kids at different schools around the country at least once a year. The policy aimed to make the students understand their culture and tradition.

Annual events 
The organising associations as well as the venues change every year, though not necessary, but regularly.

2017  
On 1st April 2017, the festival was organised at the Model High School, Keishamthong, by "Repertory for Performing Arts of Manipur" under the aegis of Sangeet Natak Akademi, New Delhi.

2018 
On 21st April 2018, the festival was organised at Oxfort English School, Takyel, Imphal West, by Forward Artistes Centre En-camped (FACE), under the aegis of Sangeet Natak Akademi, Ministry of Culture and Directorate of Art & Culture.

2022 
On 23rd and 24th December 2022, the festival was jointly organised by the "Moirang Thangjing Yageirel Marup", "Moirang College', "Kumbi College" and "Khamba Thoibi Dance Academy, Moirang", at INA Martyr's Memorial Hall in Moirang.
During the festival, a painting competition, on the theme, "Loika Loikum", was organised for students from Class III-VII, besides other events including dance and musical performances.

During the festival, various research scholars, from different academic institutions, presented several research papers, about Meitei culture.

See also 
 Epic cycles of incarnations in Moirang 
 Khamba Thoibi
 Pena (musical instrument)
 Emoinu Fish Fest

Notes

References

External links 
 Festival of Moirang Shai at 

Festivals established in the 2020s
Meitei festivals